Taxes in Germany are levied by the federal government, the states (Länder) as well as the municipalities (Städte/Gemeinden). Many direct and indirect taxes exist in Germany; income tax and VAT are the most significant.

The legal basis for taxation is established in the German Constitution, which lays out the basic principles governing tax law. Most taxation is decided by the federal government and the states together, some are allocated solely at the federal level (e.g., customs), some are allocated to the states (excise taxes), and districts and municipalities may enact their own tax laws. Notwithstanding the division of tax law jurisdiction, in practice, 95% of all taxes are imposed at the federal level.

At the federal level, the government receives tax revenues from residents in the form of individual income tax, property sales taxes, and capital gains. The amount of federal tax liability may be reduced by various deductions, and mitigated by various allowances for children. Some non-residents are liable in Germany if they have certain types of income there. Generally, public and private corporations are liable for taxes in Germany, with certain exemptions such as charitable foundations and religious institutions. Products and services generated in Germany are subject to value-added tax (VAT) under EU rules, with certain exemptions. Other types of tax revenue include real property transfers, inheritance and gift taxes, capital gains, aviation, and motor vehicle taxes.

Terminology and concepts 

The German word for tax is Steuer which originates from the Old High German noun  meaning 'support'.

The general definition of the term "tax" is contained in the first sentence of paragraph 3(1) of the Tax Code: "Taxes are monetary payments that do not constitute consideration for a particular service and are imposed by a public authority for the purpose of generating revenue on all those who meet the criteria to which the law attaches the obligation to pay; the generation of revenue may be an ancillary purpose."

The  (lit.

General legal or administrative jurisdictions in Germany fall roughly into four levels: federal, state (plural ), district (plural ), and municipality (plural ), and tax authority follows this same pattern, although it is concentrated chiefly at the federal and state level.

The fiscal administration, also known as tax administration) in Germany is the part of public administration which is responsible for the determination and collection of taxes. The Federal Central Tax Office (or BZSt) is the federal agency responsible for administering certain sections of the country's tax code. It was spun off from the Federal Ministry of Finance in 2006.

Taxation principles
The German Constitution lays down the principles governing taxation in the following articles:

 The ability-to-pay principle:
When calculating the tax liability, the taxpayer may claim tax-reducing personal characteristics, e.g. special expenses, extraordinary burdens. The ability-to-pay principle includes vertical tax equity, which means that everyone should be taxed according to their ability to pay. Everyone should bear the tax burden to the extent that they are able to do so. This is also the reason for progressive taxation.
 Equality in taxation
Tax equity intends the vertical and horizontal tax equity. Horizontal tax equity implies that taxpayers with the same level of income should be taxed equally.

Vertical tax equity implies that taxpayers with different incomes should be taxed according to their ability to pay.
 The lawfulness of taxation
 The welfare state principle

The right to decide on taxes is subdivided:
 The federation has the right on customs. (Constitution, Art. 105 para. 1)
 The federation and the states decide together on most of the tax law. Formally, the states can decide that there is no federal law. In practice, there are federal laws for all taxation issues. (Art. 105 para. 2 )
 The states decide on local excise taxes. (Constitution, Art. 105 para. 2a)
 The municipalities and the districts can decide on some minor local taxes like the taxation of dogs.

So even if Germany is a federal state, 95% of all taxes are imposed on a federal level. The income of these taxes is allocated by the federation and the states as following (Constitution, Art. 106):

 The federation receives exclusively the revenue of:
 Customs
 Taxes on alcopops, cars, distilled beverages, coffee, mineral oil products, sparkling wine, electricity, tobacco, and insurance
 Supplement on income taxes so-called solidarity surcharge
 The states receive exclusively the revenue of:
 Inheritance tax, real property transfer tax
 Taxes on beer and gambling
 Fire protection tax
 The municipalities and/or districts receive exclusively the revenue of:
 Real property tax
 Taxes on other beverages, dogs, and inns.

Most of the revenue is earned by income tax and VAT. The revenues of these taxes are distributed between the federation and the states by quota. The municipalities receive a part of the income of the states. In addition, there is a compensation between rich and poor states (Constitution, Art. 107).

Structure and basic information

Administration 
Germany's fiscal administration is divided into federal tax authorities and state tax authorities. The local tax offices (plural ) belong to the latter. They administer the "shared taxes" for the federation and the states and process the tax returns. The number of tax offices in Germany totals around 650.

As a result of discussions in 2006 and 2009 between federation and states (the so-called ), the Federation also administers some taxes. The competent authority is the Federal Central Tax Office (or BZSt) which is also competent authority for certain applications of tax refund from abroad. Since 2009, the BZSt allocates an identification number for tax purposes to every taxable person.

Jurisdiction
There is at least one Fiscal Court in every state (Berlin and Brandenburg, however, share a court located in Cottbus). Appeals against the decisions of the Fiscal Courts are heard by the Federal Fiscal Court in Munich.

Fiscal code
The common rules and procedures applying to all taxes are contained in the fiscal code as so-called general tax law. The individual tax laws regulate in which case tax is incurred.

The German Fiscal Code (Abgabenordnung, AO) is divided into nine parts, which essentially reflect the chronological sequence of the taxation procedure. The introductory provisions explain the basic tax concepts that apply to all taxes.

Tax identification numbers
From 2009 onward, every German resident receives a personal tax identification number. In the coming years, businesses will be receiving a business identification number. The competent authority is the Federal Central Tax Office.

Tax revenue

In 2014, German tax revenue totaled €593 billion.

Federal, state and local tax revenues (excluding municipal taxes) increased by a total of 11.5 percent to EUR 761.0 billion in fiscal year 2021 compared with fiscal year 2020. This exceptionally strong growth was due to the pandemic-related decline in the previous year.

Community taxes made up the largest share of the total at EUR 626.0 billion, or 82.3 percent. Compared with the previous year, they increased by 15.0 percent or EUR 81.8 billion. The main contributors were taxes on sales (+31.3 billion euros) and income- and profit-related tax types such as corporate income tax (+17.9 billion euros), assessed income tax (+13.4 billion euros) and payroll tax (+9.1 billion euros).

Tax revenue is distributed to Germany's three levels of government: the federation, the states, and the municipalities. All of these are jointly entitled to the most important types of tax (i.e., value-added tax and income tax). For this reason, these taxes are also known as shared taxes. Tax revenue is distributed proportionately using a formula prescribed in the German Constitution.

Taxes on income

Income tax for residents
Individuals who are residents in Germany or have their normal place of abode there have full income tax liability. This type of tax liability is known as unlimited tax liability and is based on the definition of habitual residence. A person is resident where he or she stays under circumstances that indicate that he or she is staying at that place or in that area on more than a temporary basis. Habitual residence within the scope of the Tax Act shall always be deemed to be a continuous stay of more than six months from the beginning; short-term interruptions shall not be taken into consideration. This is clarified in paragraph 9 of the Tax Code.

All the income earned by these persons both at home and abroad is subject to German tax (principle of world income). The principle of world income indicates that the taxpayer's taxation extends to all their world income, regardless of where the income was earned. The principle is stated in the Income Tax Guidelines (EStR). The Income Tax Guidelines (EStR) are not binding on the taxpayer, but only on the tax authorities.

Persons who neither have a residence in Germany nor stay in Germany for more than 183 days, but who receive certain domestic income pursuant to Section 49 income tax law (EStG), have limited income tax liability subject to Section 1 (4) income tax law (EStG).

Types of income
For the purposes of charging income tax in Germany, earnings are divided into seven different types of income. A distinction is made between:
Income from agriculture and forestry
Income from business operations
Income from self-employed work
Income from employed work
Income from capital
Income from letting property
Miscellaneous income.
If a taxpayer's income does not fall into any of these categories, then it is not subject to income tax. This includes winnings at a lottery, for example.

Income tax

The rate of income tax in Germany ranges from 0% to 45%. The German income tax is a progressive tax, which means that the average tax rate (i.e., the ratio of tax and taxable income) increases monotonically with increasing taxable income. Moreover, the German taxation system warrants that an increase in taxable income never results in a decrease of the net income after taxation. The latter property is due to the fact that the marginal tax rate (i.e., the tax paid on one euro additional taxable income) is always below 100%. The marginal tax rate brackets and the resulting average tax rate of the income tax are depicted in the graph to the right; in the 14-24% and 24-42% brackets, the rate increases linearly with income within the bracket. The tax liability of married couples who file jointly is assessed on half their total income, and the result from applying the tax tariff is multiplied by two afterwards. Due to the progressive tax schedule, this always more favorable than taxing each spouse separately. This splitting advantage increases with the income difference between both spouses.

The assessment basis for income tax is the taxable income. The calculations are governed by the income tax scale. Every year, an income tax table is compiled that shows employees the amount of income tax deducted briefly. This is regulated in §32a EStG (Income Tax Act).

There is a distinction between the wage tax and the income tax in German income tax legislation. The wage tax is a collection form of the income tax.

The wage tax is levied for all employees. As soon as further income is added or income from a self-employed activity is present, one speaks of income tax. This is due to the different designations "wage" for employees and "income" for all other income.

Income tax comprises a total of seven types of income, including salaries and income from freelance and self-employed activities. Wage tax and capital gains tax are therefore not independent types of tax, but collection forms of income tax.

One additional fact about the income tax system in Germany is that it is assessed on the net income of an individual or married couple, which includes a deduction for the social security contributions they pay. In 2019, this averages somewhere around 19.7% of personal income. So, in reality, the marginal tax rates displayed below only apply to ~80.3% of the income of an individual up to 55,960 euros. This in turn decreases the income tax liability for the average employee by around 4%, although it still is possible to pay an effective rate of nearly 45% if one's income is high enough.

Finally, there is a tax refund that averages around 1000 euros. As an employee, you can declare income-related expenses in your tax declaration. These are "expenses incurred to acquire, secure and maintain income" (Section 9 (1) sentence 1 of the German Income Tax Act, EStG). These include "all expenses caused by the occupation" (R 9.1 para. 1 sentence 1 Wage Tax Guidelines, LStR). This means that expenses incurred due to a profession can be claimed in the tax return. Specifically, these can be the following expenses, among others: work equipment, job application costs, costs for work and official clothing (if this is typical work clothing e.g. doctor's coat, safety shoes or uniforms), contributions to professional associations, account management fees and expenses for travel between home and the first place of work. The employee lump sum is only available for income from non-self-employment. It cannot therefore be applied to income from self-employment, renting or leasing.

Solidarity surcharge
On top of income tax, the so-called solidarity surcharge ( or ) is levied at a rate of 5.5% of the income tax for higher incomes. The solidarity surcharge was introduced in 1991 and, since 1995, has been justified with the additional costs of the German reunification. These include the debts and pension obligations of the East German government, as well as the costs of upgrading infrastructure and environmental remediation in the new states of Germany. Since 2021 the solidarity surcharge has been scaled back considerably. From January 2021 onwards, up to €16,956 (€33,912 for married couples) annual income tax, no solidarity surcharge is levied (previously: €972/€1,944). This means up to a yearly income of €62,127 (€124,255 for married couples) no surcharge is levied.

Above this threshold, the solidarity surcharge rate averages at 5.5%.

For example, if €10,000 income tax result from a certain annual taxable income, a solidarity surcharge of €550 will be levied on top. As a result, the tax payer owes the taxation office €10,550.

The solidarity surcharge was introduced as a supplementary tax to income tax and corporate income tax and must in principle be paid by all employed persons.

The reasons for the introduction of the solidarity surcharge were financial compensation for:

 Additional burdens from the Gulf conflict
 Structurally weak countries in Central, Eastern and Southern Europe
 Costs of German unification / reunification

Tax on benefits in kind
Every individual has to pay for any perks or benefits they receive from an employer, which includes, for example, the use of a car. This applies to private car usage too if the car is owned by a company or a self-employed individual. In the case of cars, this is based on either a log-book method or a flat-rate method, which depends on the gross-list-price of a car rounded down to the next 100 EUR. This means the original list-price without any reduction or discount at the time of first original use, whether or not the car is used or some years old. VAT and every extra features (e.g. GPS, leather seats etc.) need to be included. Tax is paid on one per cent of this basis as the taxable amount every month.

Example:
Gross-list-price: 45,000 EUR
Additional taxable income: 450 EUR each month
(e.g. 30% tax rate causes 125 EUR tax payable)

Withholding taxes
Tax on income from employed work and tax on capital income are both retained by being deducted at source (pay-as-you-earn tax, wages tax, or withholding tax). Here, an amount of tax is retained directly by the employer or by the bank before the earnings are paid out.

The taxation at source for employment income will be carried out based in taxation classes based on the personal status. The tax classes essentially differ by the exemption threshold that is applied. Married couples face a decision of opting for a combination of classes III/V or IV/IV. In the former case, the spouse with higher earnings receives the twice the basic exemption rate, while the second earner is taxed at very low earnings. In the latter case, both spouses are taxed based on the standard exemption rate. The choice of tax classes only matters for the withholding tax and hence for the income that is immediately at disposal. After the income tax assessment, which happens a few months after the tax year has ended, the tax rebate is not affected by the choice of tax class. Beyond, employers are also liable to deduct the contributions to the social security system at source.

Taxation classes (tax groups,  aka )
class I = single, living in a registered civil partnership, divorced, widowed or married, unless they fall under tax category II, III or IV.
class II = single but is entitled to single parent allowance.
class III = married and spouse does not earn wages, or the spouse earns a wage but is classified under tax category V by request of both spouses, or to widowed workers for the calendar year following that of the spouse' death if both were residing in Germany and were not separated on the day of the spouse's death.
class IV = married, both spouses earn a wage, reside in Germany, and are not separated.
class V = married but one of the spouses, at both spouses' request, is classified under tax category III.
class VI = workers receiving multiple wages from more than one employer, in order for wage tax to be withheld for the second and any additional employment contracts.

The taxation at source for capital income will be done with a flat tax rate of 25% (add solidarity surcharge of 5.5% of the amount of tax and, if applicable, church tax).

Deductions
German income tax law allows a considerable number of taxpayer's costs to be deducted from income when computing taxable income. This applies in particular to costs immediately related to earnings. Apart from this, other costs are also deductible, e.g., certain insurance payments, costs incurred by sickness, costs for home help, and maintenance payments. In addition to the possibility of deducting costs, there are also numerous allowances and lump-sum amounts which reduce taxable income, e.g., an allowance for capital earnings currently at €801 (€1,602 for married couples) and a lump sum of €1000 (earnings in 2011 or onwards) is deducted from income from employed work. Expenditure on child support and on children's vocational training is taken into account with a special tax allowance, with allowances for costs expended on child supervision, education and training, and with child benefit payments.

Tax return
The obligation to file an income tax return does not apply to everybody. For example, single assessed tax payers who exclusively earn income subject to withholding tax are exempt from this obligation, because their tax debt is deemed to be at least settled by the withholding tax. Nevertheless, any person having full tax liability is allowed to file a tax return, taking into account the tax already withheld at the source and possible deductions. In many cases, this may result in a tax refund.

Married couples can apply for joint assessment to be taxed at a more favourable rate. In this case, they must file the annual tax return as it is possible that the tax paid through withholding tax was not sufficient.

Income tax for non-residents
Individuals who are neither resident of Germany nor have their normal place of abode there are only liable to pay tax in Germany if they earn income there which has a close domestic (German) context. This includes in particular income from real estate in Germany or from a permanent establishment in Germany.

Tax obligations for non-resident German property owners
Every non-resident German property owner is subject to a personal levy on income derived from their German property. Non-resident real estate investors are also obliged to file a German property tax return each year.

Tax residency status and property ownership
In order to be considered a resident in Germany, an individual must spend over 183 days in the country during a two-year period.
It is important to note that German real estate owners are liable for taxation regardless of their tax residency status.

Double taxation agreements

Germany has reached tax treaties with about 90 countries to avoid double taxation. These agreements fall under public international law and aim to avoid both double taxation and double non-taxation of individuals and companies. The basic structure of the double taxation agreements which Germany has signed follows the Model Tax Convention drawn up by the OECD.

In addition to the double taxation agreements in the field of income and wealth taxes, there are special double taxation agreements in the field of inheritance and gift taxes and motor vehicle tax, as well as agreements in the field of legal and administrative assistance and the exchange of information. In particular, the exchange of information between tax authorities is an important element in detecting and combating tax evasion and avoidance and in enabling accurate taxation.

Social Security Contributions
Employment income earned in Germany is subject to different insurance contributions covering health, pension, nursing and unemployment insurance. Contributions are levied as a percent of income until a certain ceiling shared equally between employee and employer. Table of contributions for 2018:

Taxes on corporation & capital income

Corporation tax
 Corporation tax is charged first and foremost on corporate enterprises, in particular public and private limited companies, as well as other corporations such as e.g. cooperatives, associations and foundations. Sole proprietorships and partnerships are not subject to corporation tax: profits earned by these set-ups are attributed to their individual partners and then taxed in the context of their personal income tax bills.

Corporations domiciled or managed in Germany are deemed to have full corporation tax liability. This means that their domestic and foreign earnings are all taxable in Germany. Some corporate enterprises are exempted from corporation tax, e.g. charitable foundations, Church institutions, and sports clubs.

As of 1 January 2008, Germany's corporation tax rate is 15%. Counting both the solidarity surcharge (5.5% of corporation tax) and trade tax (averaging 14% as of 2008), tax on corporations in Germany is just below 30%.

Assessment base
The assessment base for the corporation tax charged is the revenue which the corporate enterprise has earned during the calendar year. Taxable profits are determined using the result posted in the annual accounts (balance sheet and Income statement) drawn up under the Commercial Code. What is deemed income under tax law sometimes diverges from the way earnings are determined under commercial law, in which case tax law provisions prevail.

Dividends
When dividends are paid to an individual person, capital yield tax at a rate of 25% is charged. Since 1 January 2009, this tax is final for individuals who are residents of Germany. Solidarity surcharge is also imposed on capital yields tax.

When dividends are paid to an enterprise with full corporation tax liability, the recipient business is largely exempted from paying tax on these revenues. In its tax assessment, merely 5% of the dividends are added to profits as non-deductible operating expenses. The same applies if a taxable corporate enterprise sells shares in another company.

Deducting tax from dividends paid by a subsidiary with full tax liability to a foreign parent domiciled in the EU is waived on certain conditions, e.g., the parent company has to have a direct holding in the subsidiary of at least 15%.

Integrated fiscal units (group taxation)
Under German tax law, separate companies may be treated as integrated fiscal units for tax purposes. In an integrated fiscal unit, a legally independent company (the controlled company) agrees under a profit and loss pooling agreement to become dependent on another business (the controlling company) in financial, economic and organisational terms. The controlled company undertakes to pay over its entire profits to the controlling company. Another requirement is that the controlling company has to hold the majority of voting rights in the controlled company.

In tax terms, recognition of a fiscal unit means that the income of the controlled company is allocated to the controlling company. This provides an opportunity to balance profits and losses within the integrated fiscal unit.

Trade tax
Entrepreneurs engaging in business operations are subject to trade tax as well as income tax/corporation tax. In contrast to the latter, trade tax is charged by the local authorities or municipalities, who are entitled to the entire amount. The rate levied is fixed by each local authority separately within the range of rates prescribed by the central government. As from 1 January 2008, the rate averages 14% of profits subject to trade tax.

Assessment procedure
The business entity has to file the trade tax return with the tax office, like its other tax returns. Taking any allowances into account, the local tax office calculates the trade earnings and then gives the applicable figure for a trade tax assessment to the local authority collecting the tax. The underlying profit base, as well as the book-tax differences for the local trade tax jurisdictions, may differ from that used for the corporation tax. On the basis of the collecting rate in force in its area, the local authority calculates the trade tax payable.

Unincorporated enterprises
One-man businesses and members of a partnership may deduct a large portion of trade tax from their personal income tax bill.

Incorporated enterprises
As from 1 January 2008, corporate entities may no longer deduct trade tax from their taxable profits.

Real property tax
Municipalities levy a tax on real property. The tax rates vary because they depend on the decision of the local parliament. The tax is payable every quarter. In 2018, the German Constitutional Court ruled the current property tax as not in line with the constitution. This is because properties are taxed based on their value from the early 1960s (1930s in East Germany), violating the horizontal equity principle.

Real property transfer tax
Transfers of real property are taxable. The vendee and the vendor are common debtors of the tax. In general the vendee has to pay the tax. The tax rate is defined by the individual states. In general the tax rate is 3.5%, but all states except Bavaria and Saxony have increased it since 2011. Most states now have a tax rate of 4.5% or 5%; the highest are North Rhine-Westphalia, Saarland and Schleswig-Holstein with 6.5%.

Real estate investors are also impacted by the speculation tax.  This tax applies to gains generated on real estate investments, if sold less than ten years after purchase.  Depreciation deductions of prior years are added to the sales price of the home, to derive a higher taxable gain.

Vendor profit from real estate sales in Germany is considered capital gains if the real estate has been held for less than ten years.

Inheritance and gift tax
A single law regulates both inheritance tax and gift tax, requiring the payment of rates from 7% to 50% both on transfers following death and on gifts among the living. In contrast to the U.S. estate tax, the inheritance and gift tax is paid by the recipient of the transfer. The tax rates depend on the amount and on the relationship between donor and recipient. There are also substantial exemption rates, amounting to €500,000 for transfers between married partners and €400,000 for transfers to own (step-)children. Deductions as high as 100% apply to cases such as family houses and the possessions of entrepreneurs.

Capital gains tax
In Germany there is no special capital gains tax. Only under certain conditions gains from private disposal may be taxed. Since 1 January 2009 Germany levies a final tax amounting to 25% plus 5.5% solidarity surcharge. This may take effect like a capital gains tax for resident persons e.g. disposal of shares. The  replaces the earlier  that had been in effect in Germany since 2001.

Consumption Taxes

Value-added tax
As a matter of principle, all services and products generated in Germany by a business entity are subject to value-added tax (VAT). The German VAT is part of the European Union value added tax system.

Exemptions
Certain goods and services are exempted from value-added tax by law; this applies for German and foreign businesses alike.

For example, the following are exempted from German value-added tax:

export deliveries
intra-Community supply of goods
services provided by certain professional groups (e.g. doctors)
financial services (e.g. granting loans)
letting real estate in the long-term
cultural services provided to the public (e.g. by public theatres, museums, zoos, etc.),
value-added by certain institutions providing general education or vocational training
services provided in an honorary or voluntary capacity.

Tax rate
The rate of value-added tax rate generally in force in Germany is 19%. A reduced tax rate of 7% applies e.g. on sales of certain foods, books and magazines and transports.

Due to COVID-19, the government accepted a lowering to 16% (reduced: 5%) from 1 July 2020 until 31 December 2020 for the rates. The overall intended effect of the reduction, stimulating the economy, was marginal and further diminished by the costs of adjusting prices (which not all businesses did), changing sales and billing systems, and doing that twice in such a short time.

Payment of the tax
Within ten days of the end of each calendar quarter, the business entity has to send the tax office an advance return in which it has to give its own computation of the tax for the preceding calendar quarter. The amount payable is the value-added tax it has invoiced, minus any amounts of deductible input tax. Deductible input tax is the value-added tax which the entrepreneur has been charged by other business entities.

The amount thus calculated has to be paid to the tax office through an advance. This means that the amount due must be paid in full before the next fiscal quarter. Larger businesses have to file the advance return every month. For entrepreneurs who have only just taken up professional or commercial operations, the monthly reporting period likewise applies during the first calendar year and in the year after that.

At the end of the calendar year, the entrepreneur has to file an annual tax return in which it has again calculated the tax.

Small businesses
Entrepreneurs whose turnover (plus the value-added tax on it) has not exceeded EUR 17,500 in the preceding calendar year and is not expected to exceed EUR 50,000 in the current year (small enterprises), do not need to pay value-added tax. However, these small enterprises are not allowed to deduct the input tax they have been billed.

Aviation tax 

Starting 1 January 2011, all passenger flights departing from Germany are subject to the aviation tax. The amount of tax to be paid depends on the distance to the final destination. Flights to a destination up to 2,500 km away will incur a tax of €8 per passenger. The amount increases to €25 for distances of up to 6,000 km and €45 for distances beyond this. The distance taken into account is that for the entire journey as booked. For flights involving a transfer or short stopover, this means that the tax only becomes chargeable on the initial departure.

Motor vehicle tax
A tax is imposed on the owners of motor vehicles. It is levied depending on the type of vehicle (car, motorcycle, commercial truck, trailer, motorhome, etc.). The tax is due annually after the registration of the vehicle.
With cars, the tax is different for gasoline and diesel engines.  Diesel powered cars are taxed higher. The tax amount also depends on the emissions class (Euro 1 – Euro 6), whether a diesel car has a soot particle filter, and the initial date of vehicle registration.

Purely electric vehicles are exempt from taxes for at least five years after initial registration.

Financial crisis 2009
Existing depreciations e.g. for certain private housekeeping expenses and for small and medium-sized enterprises have been enhanced. A declining depreciation for movable assets has been reintroduced for two years (2009–2010). Businesses are allowed to carry back losses and to claim refund of paid corporation/income tax. As a result, they get liquidity improvement. From 2010-01-01 on the VAT tax rate concerning hotel accommodation is reduced from 19% to 7%.

See also
 German Taxpayers Federation
 Monthly reports of Federal Ministry of Finance (partly English)

Notes

External links

German Fiscal Code (Abgabenordnung)
German Income Tax Law (Einkommensteuergesetz)
German Corporation Tax Law (Koerperschafsteuergesetz)
German Trade Tax Law (Gewerbesteuergesetz)
German Value-Added Tax Law (Umsatzsteuergesetz)
Germany’s Double Taxation Agreements
OECD Model Tax Convention
Federal Ministry of Finance: Information about inheritance and gift tax (German)
Federal Ministry of Finance: Aviation Tax – a new charge for airlines (English)
Federal Ministry of Finance: Germany’s financial, budgetary and fiscal policies (English)
Federal Ministry of Finance: Bund/Länder financial relations (English)
Tax calculator from Federal Ministry of Finance (German)
Federal Central Tax Office (German)
Federal Statistical Office / Taxes (English/German)
Central Bank (English/German)
Federal Fiscal Court (English)
Tax obligations for non-resident German rental property owners (English)